Dataframe may refer to:

 A tabular data structure common to many data processing libraries:
 
 The Dataframe API in Apache Spark
 Data frames in the R programming language
 Frame (networking)